Turkey competed at the 1968 Summer Olympics in Mexico City, Mexico. 29 competitors, all men, took part in 29 events in 4 sports.

Medalists

Athletics

Boxing

Shooting

Three shooters, all men, represented Turkey in 1968.

50 m pistol
 Türker Özenbaş

50 m rifle, three positions
 Mehmet Dursun

50 m rifle, prone
 Mehmet Dursun

Trap
 Metin Salihoğlu

Wrestling

References

External links
Official Olympic Reports
International Olympic Committee results database

Nations at the 1968 Summer Olympics
1968
1968 in Turkish sport